Marcelle Mendes Rodrigues  (born 17 October 1976 in Lavras) is a Brazilian volleyball player, playing as a setter.

She was a member of Brazilian team at the 1995 Pan-American Games at Mar del Plata, and the 2002 FIVB World Championship. Also she participated in the 2005 FIVB World Grand Prix, the 2006 FIVB World Grand Prix, the 2005 FIVB Women's World Grand Champions Cup and the 2005 Montreux Volley Masters.

Clubs
  Minas Tênis Clube (1995–1996)
  Leites Nestlé (1996–1997)
  Club Athletico Paulistano (1997–1998)
  Osasco (1998–2002)
  São Caetano (2002–2003)
  ACF/Campos (2003–2005)
  Macaé Sports (2005–2006)
  RC Cannes (2006–2007)
  Monte Schiavo Jesi (2007–2008)
  VC Zarechye Odintsovo (2008–2009)

Awards

Individual
 2002 FIVB World Grand Prix – "Best Setter"
 2002 FIVB World Championship – "Best Setter"

References

External links 
Player's biography
CEV - Confédération Européenne de Volleyball
60 Top Marcelle Moraes Pictures, Photos and Images - Getty Images

1976 births
Living people
Brazilian women's volleyball players
Middle blockers
People from Lavras
Sportspeople from Minas Gerais